SAMT may refer to:
Samara Time, the time zone 4 hours ahead of UTC
SAMT (organization), the Organization for Researching and Composing University Textbooks in the Humanities

People
Wilma Samt, Austrian chess master

See also
Blauer Samt, an album by Torch